Ripne is a village in Kalush Raion, Ivano-Frankivsk Oblast, Ukraine. It belongs to Duba rural hromada, one of the hromadas of Ukraine. The village has a population of 964.

Until 18 July 2020, Ripne belonged to Rozhniativ Raion. It was the biggest settlement in the raion. The raion was abolished in July 2020 as part of the administrative reform of Ukraine, which reduced the number of raions of Ivano-Frankivsk Oblast to six. The area of Rozhniativ Raion was merged into Kalush Raion.

References

External links
 Ripne at the Verkhovna Rada of Ukraine site

Villages in Kalush Raion